Euthycarcinoidea are an enigmatic group of extinct possibly amphibious arthropods that ranged from Cambrian to Triassic times. Fossils are known from Europe, North America, Argentina, Australia and Antarctica.

Description
The euthycarcinoid body was divided into a cephalon (head), preabdomen, and postabdomen. The cephalon consisted of two segments and included mandibles, antennae and presumed eyes. The preabdomen consisted of five to fourteen tergites, each having up to three somites. Each somite had in turn a pair of uniramous, segmented legs. The postabdomen was limbless and consisted of up to six segments and a terminal tail spine.

Affinities
Due to its particular combination of characteristics, the position of the Euthycarcinoidea within the Arthropoda has been ambiguous; previous authors have allied euthycarcinoids with crustaceans (interpreted as copepods, branchiopods, or an independent group), with trilobites, or the merostomatans (horseshoe crabs and sea scorpions, now an obsolete group). However, due to the general features and the discovery of fossils from this group in Cambrian rocks, a 2010 study suggested that they may have given rise to the mandibulates, the group that includes the myriapods (centipedes, millipedes and the like), crustaceans, and hexapods (insects, etc.).

However, a 2020 study identified several characters, including compound eyes and various details of the preoral chamber, that suggested instead a position as the closest relatives of living myriapods. This would help to close the gap between the earliest body fossils of crown-group myriapods in the Silurian and molecular clock data suggesting a divergence from their closest relatives during the Ediacaran or Cambrian. This had already been suggested by the cladogram of a previous study.

Environment and life habits
Euthycarcinoid fossils have been found in marine, brackish and freshwater deposits. Taxa from the Cambrian are from marine or intertidal sediments, while all specimens from the Ordovician to the Triassic are freshwater or brackish. Fossil impressions of euthycarcinoid postabdomens in association with Protichnites trackways in Cambrian intertidal/supratidal deposits also suggest that euthycarcinoids may have been the first arthropods to walk on land. It has been suggested that the biofilms and microbial mats that covered much of the vast tidal flats during the Cambrian Period in North America may have provided the nourishment that lured these arthropods onto the land. Fossil evidence also suggests the possibility that some euthycarcinoids came onto the land to lay and fertilize their eggs via amplexus, as do the modern horseshoe crabs.

Classification
The known species of euthycarcinoids and their distribution were reviewed by Racheboeuf et al. in 2008. Additional species were described by Collette and Hagadorn in 2010.

 Antarcticarcinus
 Antarcticarcinus pagoda Pagoda Formation Antarctica, Upper Carboniferous to Lower Permian.

 Apankura machu (Cambrian), from marine deposits in Argentina 
 Euthycarcinus
 Euthycarcinus ibbenburensis (Pennsylvanian: Westphalian), from freshwater deposits in Germany 
 Euthycarcinus martensi (Permian), from freshwater deposits in Germany
 Euthycarcinus kessleri (Triassic), from freshwater deposits in France
 Mosineia macnaughtoni (Cambrian), from intertidal deposits in the United States
 Mictomerus melochevillensis (Cambrian), from intertidal deposits in Canada
 Pieckoxerxes pieckoae (Pennsylvanian: Westphalian), from brackish to freshwater deposits of the United States
 Synaustrus brookvalensis (Triassic) from freshwater deposits of Australia

Family Kottixexidae Starobogatov, 1988
 Heterocrania rhyniensis (Lower Devonian), from freshwater deposits of the United Kingdom
 Kalbarria brimmellae (Ordovician or Late Silurian), from freshwater deposits of Australia (Age and habitat are controversial)
Kottixerxes
 Kottixerxes anglicus (Pennsylvanian: Westphalian), from brackish to freshwater deposits of the United Kingdom  
 Kottyxerxes gloriosus (Pennsylvanian: Westphalian), from brackish to freshwater deposits of the United States
 Schramixerxes gerem (Late Pennsylvanian: Stephanian stage), from freshwater deposits in France
 Smithixerxes
 Smithixerxes juliarum (Pennsylvanian: Westphalian), from brackish to freshwater deposits of the United States
 Smithixerxes pustulosus (Pennsylvanian: Westphalian), from brackish to freshwater deposits of the United Kingdom  
 Sottyxerxes multiplex (Late Pennsylvanian: Stephanian stage), from freshwater deposits in France

References

Bibliography

Arthropod enigmatic taxa
Paleozoic arthropods
Triassic arthropods
Fossil taxa described in 1964
Cambrian first appearances
Middle Triassic extinctions
Arthropod subclasses